Fu Bo (born February 28, 1965) is a Chinese football manager as well as also being a former footballer who was predominantly a midfielder.

Playing career
Fu Bo would start his football career with his local football team Liaoning F.C. and with them go on to be part of the squad that won the 1985 league title. With Liaoning Fu would be part of the team that dominated the Chinese game and won several leagues, cups as well as 1989-90 Asian Club Championship. While he may have been part of the squad that saw Liaoning dominate Chinese football as well as gain full-professionalism Fu did not gain an international cap and retired a year after once Liaoning were relegated at the end of the 1995 Chinese league campaign.

Coaching career
Along with former Chinese international footballer Su Maozhen, Fu Bo went abroad on September 3, 2007 to Cologne, Germany to gain his coaching badges. This would eventually lead to Fu gaining an assistant coaching job with the Chinese national team when Gao Hongbo became the head coach in 2009. After several years Fu was trusted enough to go on lead the team on a one-off occasion in a friendly match against New Zealand on March 25, 2011 that ended in a 1-1 draw. While he would soon return to his assistant duties Fu would have a new head coach to work under when José Antonio Camacho took over the team on August 13, 2011. As well as working under Camacho, Fu was also promoted to be the head coach of the China U-22 team in 2012. After a series of disappointing results Camacho was fired and Fu took on the national team on a caretaker basis. He was eventually succeeded by Frenchman Alain Perrin. On 27 March 2017, Fu was appointed the assistant coach of Chinese Super League side Guangzhou Evergrande. On 25 September 2018, he had his contract terminated by mutual consent. The next day Fu moved to China League One club Meixian Techand as their head coach.

China results

Managerial statistics

Honours

As a player
Liaoning FC
 Chinese Jia-A League: 1985, 1987, 1988, 1990, 1991, 1993
 Chinese FA Cup: 1984, 1986
 Asian Club Championship: 1989–1990

References

External links
Player profile at Sodasoccer.com

1965 births
Living people
China national football team managers
Chinese footballers
Footballers from Shenyang
Association football midfielders
Liaoning F.C. players
Changsha Ginde players
Shenzhen F.C. players
Guangdong South China Tiger F.C. managers
Chinese football managers
Guangzhou F.C. non-playing staff
Association football coaches